Mount Burnham is one of the highest peaks in the San Gabriel Mountains. It is in the Sheep Mountain Wilderness. It is named for Frederick Russell Burnham the famous American military scout who taught Scoutcraft (then known as woodcraft) to Robert Baden-Powell and became one of the inspirations for the founding of the Boy Scouts.  Mount Burnham was officially recognized by the USGS at a dedication ceremony in 1951.
It was original known as (West Twin) "North Baldy Mountain". In 1956, Mount Burnham was added to the list of Signature Summits by the Hundred Peaks Section of the Sierra Club.

Background

The Pacific Crest Trail follows the same route in this area.

Most of the forest on Mount Burnham and along the trail consist of plants native to the region. The peak is covered by limber pine (Pinus flexilis), lodgepole (P. contorta), sugar pine (P. lambertiana), and Jeffrey pine (P. jeffreyi).  Other plants of note include Holodiscus microphyllus, Monardella cinerea, Eriogonum umbellatum, Oreonana vestita, Cycladenia humilis, and the rare, local yellow-flowered Peirson's lupine (Lupinus peirsonii). The area is occasionally visited by bighorn sheep and a rare mountain lion.

Rocks in the area range in age from Pre-Cambrian (probable) igneous and metamorphics to Pre-Cretaceous metamorphics.  The Vincent Thrust Fault, the oldest major fault in the range, dating to the Mesozoic, passes through the area.

References

External links 
 

Mountains of Los Angeles County, California
San Gabriel Mountains
San Gabriel Mountains National Monument
Angeles National Forest
Scouting in the United States
Scouting monuments and memorials
Mountains of Southern California